The Lyng Cabinet governed Norway between 28 August 1963 and 25 September 1963.  It was the first in 28 years not to be led by the Norwegian Labour Party.   It was a centre-right coalition government of the Conservative Party, Centre Party, Christian Democratic Party and Liberal Party led by John Lyng of the Conservative Party. It had fifteen members, of which five were from the Conservative Party, four were from the Centre Party, three were from the Christian Democratic Party and three were from the Liberal Party. Karen Grønn-Hagen was the cabinet's only female member.

After the Socialist People's Party joined a no-confidence vote against Einar Gerhardsen's government, Lyng realised that between them, the non-Labour parties were only one seat short of a majority in the Storting.  He quickly got the non-Labour parties to form a coalition government, which took office on 28 August after the SF abstained.  The SF, however, threw its support back to Gerhardsen a month later, allowing Labour to return to power.  Nonetheless, the brief Lyng government proved that the non-Labour parties were capable of governing after three decades of Labour rule.

Cabinet members

|}

State Secretaries

References
John Lyngs regjering 1963 - Regjeringen.no

Notes

Lyng
1963 establishments in Norway
Lyng
Lyng
Lyng
Lyng
1963 disestablishments in Norway
Cabinets established in 1963
Cabinets disestablished in 1963